Senegal competed at the 1972 Summer Olympics in Munich, West Germany.

Results by event

Athletics
Men's 800 metres
Daniel Andrade
 Heat — 1:53.9 (→ did not advance, 52nd place)

Men's 1500 metres
Daniel Andrade
 Heat — 3:59.2 (→ did not advance)

Men's 5000 metres
Siatka Badji
 Heat — DNS (→ did not advance)

Men's 4 × 100 m Relay
Malang Mane, Christian do Rosario, Momar N'Dao, and Barka Sy 
 Heat — 40.95s (→ did not advance)

Basketball

Men's Team Competition
Preliminary Round (Group B)
 Lost to Soviet Union (52-94)
 Lost to Italy (56-92)
 Lost to Poland (59-95)
 Lost to Puerto Rico (57-92)
 Lost to Philippines (62-68)
 Lost to Yugoslavia (57-73)
 Lost to West Germany (62-72)
Classification Matches
 13th/16th place: Lost to Japan (67-76)
 15th/16th place: Walk-over to Egypt (2-0) → 15th place

Wrestling

References
Official Olympic Reports

Nations at the 1972 Summer Olympics
1972 Summer Olympics
Oly